Pondville State Hospital, located in Norfolk, Massachusetts, opened in 1927 as a state-operated hospital to treat cancer patients and do research on the prevention and cure of cancer. It was located in buildings of the former Norfolk State Hospital, which served the mentally ill and drug-addicted from 1912 to 1922. Pondville provided surgical services, residency training, training for Licensed Practical Nurses (from 1949), and outpatient care (St 1959, c 494). From the 1920s to the 1960s, facilities included on-site housing for many employees in separate multi-unit "cottages".  New hospital buildings were constructed in the 1960s but as the state deemphasized direct patient care, it was agreed to sell the facility to the privately owned Norwood Hospital in 1981.

References

External links 
 Asylumprojects.org homepage for Pondville State Hospital

Hospitals in Norfolk County, Massachusetts
Defunct hospitals in Massachusetts